Texas High School (THS) is a public high school in Texarkana, Texas, United States. It is part of the Texarkana Independent School District and is classified as a 5A school by the University Interscholastic League. In 2015, it was rated "Met Standard" by the Texas Education Agency.

History 
The first classes were held in 1889 for grades 7 through 11 and the first graduating class consisted of three students in 1890. In 1965, a $3 million bond was issued for a new high school on Kennedy Lane, just west of Summerhill Road, was approved. The facility was designed by noted architects Caudill Rowlett Scott and local architects Moore and Thomas. In 1969, the architecture firm was awarded the Outstanding School Architecture Award by the Texas Association of School Administrators and School Boards for its design.

Athletics 
The Texas Tigers compete in these sports: Baseball, Basketball, Cross Country, Football, Golf, Powerlifting, Soccer, Softball, Swimming and Diving, Tennis, Track and Field, and Volleyball.

Titles 
Baseball - 2009(4A)
Football - 2002(4A/D1)
Boys Swimming - 2003(4A)
Boys Track - 2014(4A)
Marching Band: Regional champions(2017), Regional Concert band Sweepstakes (2018)
Under the 2012-2014 football University Interscholastic League reclassification, Texas High competes in District 14 of classification 5A.
The school won the 4A Division I state championship in 2002 for football, and won its first 4A state championship on June 11, 2009 for its baseball.

Notable alumni 

 Joe Anderson, former professional football player
 Miller Barber, professional golfer
 Carl Finch, guitarist, keyboardist, accordionist, vocalist, songwriter, and record producer
 Cobi Hamilton, NFL player
 Jack Jenkins, NFL player
 J. D. Kimmel, NFL player
 Gary Kusin, entrepreneur
 Ryan Mallett, NFL player
 Julie Meadows, writer, web designer and former pornographic actress
 Rick Minter, NFL player
 Craig Monroe, MLB player
 Doyle Nix, NFL player
 Jerry Norton, NFL player
 Ross Perot, 1947, businessman and former Presidential candidate, named TISD Distinguished Alumni in 2009
 Collin Raye, country music singer
 Bill Rogers, professional golfer
 Marjorie Scardino, business executive
 Aysel Teymurzadeh, singer
 Nathan Vasher, NFL player
 Carolyn Wynn, model

References

External links 
 

Public high schools in Texas
Texarkana, Texas
Schools in Bowie County, Texas
Educational institutions established in 1889
1889 establishments in Texas